Ori Elon (born 1981) is an Israeli writer and filmmaker.

Early life
Elon was born in kibbutz Shluhot, Israel, and had an Orthodox Jewish upbringing.  He graduated from the Ma'aleh School of Television, Film and the Arts in Jerusalem.

Career 
Elon is the co-creator and writer (with Yehonatan Indursky) of the television drama series Shtisel (in Hebrew שטיסל), initially broadcast on satellite television station Yes Oh, and later picked up by Netflix.  He is also one of the writers of the drama series Srugim (in Hebrew  ), and the 2018 miniseries Autonomies.

In 2008 Elon authored The Invisible Show published by Keter Publishing House, a collection of short stories. In 2010, he also published the children book King Gogol also through Keter. In January 2020 Green Bean Books published another children's book called A Basket Full of Figs, illustrated by Menahem Halberstadt. Green Bean Books has also announced publication of a new children's book by Ori Elon called In the Market of Zakrobat for November 2021, again illustrated by Menahem Halberstadt.

Awards 
Israeli Ministry of Culture's Cinema Prize for The Invisible Show
Israeli Television Academy Award for Shtisel (10 awards including "Best Series" and "Best Screenplay")
Israeli Television Academy Award for Srugim

References

External links
 

Israeli writers
Israeli film directors
1981 births
Living people